Cheiridopsis velox is a species of succulent plant from South Africa.

Description 
Each branch bears between six and ten pairs of live triangular green leaves. The old leaves remain on the branch and are pale brown in colour.

Flowers are present between late winter and mid spring, although they are most common in August and September. Each solitary flower is surrounded by leaf-like bracts. They are lightly scented, and open during the day and close at night. About 90-100 petals are present in two or three rows. They have five reddish sepals, three of which have translucent margins. They all bear a brown apical bristle. Each flower has about 18 stamens. It is covered in granular idioblasts. There are eight to ten greenish stigmas.

The fruits are 8-10-locular, although 10-locular fruits are most common. The fruits are plum red when young, becoming pale or dark brown over time. They are slightly convex above and rounded and papillate (covered in papillae) below. They do not have valve wings.

Distribution and habitat 
This species is endemic to the Northern Cape of South Africa, where it is known from two localities. It grows in mountainous areas in the Richtersveld region, where is prefers quartzite plateaus. It grows on Ploegberg and Vandersterrberg.

Conservation 
The South African National Biodiversity Institute has classified Cheiridopsis velox as vulnerable. While it is not currently at risk of being trampled, it may be in the future as vegetation on lower slopes and nearer to settlements is used up by livestock, forcing them into the areas where this plant grows in search of food.

References 

velox
Flora of South Africa
Namaqualand
Plants described in 1993